Fluck is a surname. Notable people with the surname include:

Diana Dors (born Diana Mary Fluck, 1931–1984), British actress and singer
Peter Fluck (born 1941), British caricaturist
Winfried Fluck (born 1944), German academic

See also
 Flack (disambiguation)
 Fuck

German-language surnames